Sixty Summers is the third studio album by Australian singer-songwriter Julia Stone. The album was announced on 30 October 2020 alongside the release of the album's third single, "Dance", and was released on 30 April 2021.

Background and recording
The album was recorded sporadically between 2015 and 2019 and was shaped by Stone's key collaborators on the album, Thomas Bartlett, aka Doveman, and Annie Clark, aka St. Vincent. Together, Bartlett and Stone wrote and recorded over 50 demos in his studio in New York, Stone said "Making this record with Thomas, I felt so free. I can hear it in the music, he brings a sense of confidence to recording sessions." Clark, once presented with the work Bartlett and Stone had made together, fashioned Sixty Summers into the album it is, contributing vocals and guitar in addition to production.

Critical reception 

Upon release, Sixty Summers received "universal acclaim" from critics, achieving a score of 82 on Metacritic based on 4 reviews. A four star review from The Independent praised Stone for reinventing herself, with the album being called "a celebration of newly claimed liberty". The Evening Standard described the album's sound as "on a whole new planet" and made comparisons to the Taylor Swift album Folklore, with the two albums sharing collaborators in Thomas Bartlett and Matt Berninger. In a more mixed review, Gigwise praised Stone for "eagerness to embrace a more elated sound is wholly admirable" but that "certain lyrical ideas sit a touch on the nose". David James Young from NME said the music is "some of the most interesting music she's ever made".

Mid-year lists

Track listing
All tracks written by Julia Stone and Thomas Bartlett, except where noted.

Charts

References

2021 albums
Julia Stone albums
Albums produced by St. Vincent (musician)